Rex Brinkworth MBE (25 July 1929 – 29 October 1998) was the founder of the UK Down's Syndrome Association. He was a pioneer of early treatment for babies with Down syndrome through stimulation and diet. He collaborated on this with Jerome Lejeune, the French geneticist who discovered that Down syndrome is caused by an extra chromosome 21. He was also a campaigner for integrated mainstream education for children with Down syndrome, and against the use of term 'mongolism' to refer to the syndrome. By coincidence, later he and his wife themselves had a child with Down syndrome.

Biography 
Brinkworth was born on 25 July 1929 in Eastington, Stonehouse, Gloucestershire. When a small child he became friendly with two adults in the village who had Down syndrome, which influenced his later work. Brinkworth trained as a teacher, his first teaching posts being at a Grammar School in Gloucestershire, a Catholic Secondary School in Birmingham and Turners Green Secondary School for Boys in Birmingham. At the latter he specialised in remedial teaching for students with learning difficulties. He was then appointed as Head of the Remedial Department of Great Barr Comprehensive School in Birmingham. There he developed a theory that many of the problems of pupils with learning difficulties were caused by their inadequate stimulation in infancy.

Career 
In 1959 Brinkworth read of the finding by Lejeune that Down syndrome was the result of an extra chromosome At the time, there was much speculation about the relative influence of heredity or environment on children's performance.  Brinkworth tested the relative effects of these factors by giving environmental stimulation to very young children with Down syndrome, to see if their performance could be improved and the consequences of their genetic condition counteracted.  Brinkworth was already fluent in French, and he had met and married a French woman, Jackie.  He contacted Lejeune and began a fruitful collaboration with the French doctor in research into the treatment of children with Down syndrome through environmental means – diet and stimulation.

By great coincidence, in 1965 Brinkworth and Jackie had a child, whom they named Francoise, born with Down syndrome.

Brinkworth then enrolled for a Diploma in Child Psychology course at the University of Birmingham, for which he carried out a controlled experiment.  Five babies with Down syndrome were visited for four hours each week for six months, with the parents being given detailed instructions for stimulation and diet.  The babies were tested against matched control babies with Down syndrome who had not received the visits, at ages six, twelve and eighteen months.  Marked benefit was shown for the babies who had received the visits.  The results were written up in Brinkworth's dissertation at the University of Birmingham, 1967, with the title 'The Effects of Early Training on the Mongoloid Infant.'

Brinkworth began producing sheets of advice and instructions for exercises to families who contacted him.  By 1969 he was in contact with 130 families with babies with Down syndrome.  In that year he produced, with Dr. Joseph Collins, a 70-page booklet  "Improving Mongol Babies,"  published by the Northern Ireland Region of the National Society for Mentally Handicapped Children (now MENCAP).

Use of the word 'Mongol' to describe people with Down syndrome was prevalent at the timet. It derived from the first systematic description of the syndrome in 1867 by Dr John Langdon Down, after whom the syndrome is now named.  Down's paper was entitled 'Observations on an Ethnic Classification of Idiots', and attriuted the characteristics of people with Down syndrome to an affinity with a supposed Mongolian ethnic identity. Brinkworth was an outspoken critic of the term.' and he campaigned against its use. Immediately after publishing his booklet he dropped the term, and the Association he founded shortly afterwards was called 'The Down's Babies Association'. Future editions of his booklet were titled 'Improving Babies with Down's Syndrome'.

The subtitle of the booklet was' Introducing Them to School. 'At the time (until the 1971 repeal of the 1949 Education Act), children with learning difficulties, including almost those with Down syndrome, were classified as 'unsuitable for education in school'. They were catered for in 'Junior Training Centres' run by Health Authorities. The subtitle of Brinkworth's booklet reflected his belief that children with Down syndrome could and should be educated within mainstream education.

Realising the need to formalise his work and have a base to which parents could bring their children for assessment and advice, Brinkworth founded the Down's Babies Association in 1970 with headquarters at Quinborne Community Centre in Birmingham.  By 1982 it had a membership of 3,500 families.  As the children of the early members grew up, the name was changed first to 'The Down's Children's Association' and later to 'The Down's Syndrome Association.'  In the early years, Brinkworth continued to produce what he called 'schedules' of detailed instructions to parents on physical, verbal and social stimulation and on diet, and several further editions of the book were published. Other researchers took up his ideas with similar positive results. Parents have described how valuable his work has been to them.

A great boost was given to the work of the Association by a BBC TV programme shown in the Open Door series in 1976. This showed examples of Brinkworth's work and featured his own daughter Francoise.  A highly positive image of children with Down syndrome was portrayed, countering the negative picture often painted by the medical profession.  A high point in the film is when one of the children says, "I like laughing, it’s like a song to me."  Brinkworth ends the film with the words, "It’s not only in his chromosomes that we can call the mongol child the child with something extra." In the early 1980s, Brinkworth established a 'National Centre for Down's Syndrome' at Birmingham Polytechnic. Later, the Association moved its headquarters to London and a Director was appointed, Brinkworth becoming Education Adviser to the Association.  He was awarded an MBE for his services to people with Down syndrome and their families.

Brinkworth's daughter Francoise developed many skills, passing her driving test, learning to read music and play the piano, becoming fluent in French, and living independently in a flat. In 1986, Brinkworth and Francoise featured on a 30-minute video, being interviewed about their experiences and views under the title Current Perspectives on Down's Syndrome, produced by the Media Resource Centre, Darwin, Australia.

Brinkworth was a staunch Roman Catholic and he, like Jerome Lejeune, was vehemently opposed to screening and abortion as a means to prevent Down syndrome. In 1980, Brinkworth was the British representative, along with Lejeune, on a Vatican working party on people with learning difficulties. He helped to draft a speech which Pope John Paul gave for the 1981 International Year of Disabled Persons.

Increasing ill health forced Brinkworth's retirement from formal involvement in the Down's Syndrome Association, and he left in 1988.  He died after a long period of heart disease on 29 October 1998, aged 69.

This is how Brinkworth ends the piece he wrote called 'Towards a full and independent life' for a Down's Children's Association information sheet in 1982:

"For those who are cast up as strangers on our shores, we owe a duty of hospitality and tolerance.  Our neighbours, the 'children with something extra', demand much of their parents in early life, but they have much to give in return.  In enabling them to develop to their fullest potential we also serve ourselves, as an increasing number of these children grow up to play a modest but useful part in the life of the nation".

References 

1998 deaths
British philanthropists
1929 births